Christopher Michael Bishop (born 7 April 1959)   is the Laboratory Director at Microsoft Research Cambridge, Honorary Professor of Computer Science at the University of Edinburgh and a Fellow of Darwin College, Cambridge. Bishop is a member of the UK AI Council. He was also recently appointed to the Prime Minister's Council for Science and Technology.

Education
Bishop obtained a Bachelor of Arts degree  in physics from St Catherine's College, Oxford, and a PhD in Theoretical Physics from the University of Edinburgh, with a thesis on quantum field theory supervised by David Wallace and Peter Higgs.

Research and career
Bishop investigates machine learning, in which computers are made to learn from data and experience.

Written works
Bishop is the author of two highly cited and widely adopted machine learning text books: Neural Networks for Pattern Recognition (1995) and Pattern Recognition and Machine Learning (2006).

Awards and honours

Bishop was awarded the Tam Dalyell prize in 2009 and the Rooke Medal from the Royal Academy of Engineering in 2011. He gave the Royal Institution Christmas Lectures in 2008 and the Turing Lecture in 2010. Bishop was elected a Fellow of the Royal Academy of Engineering (FREng) in 2004, a Fellow of the Royal Society of Edinburgh (FRSE) in 2007, and Fellow of the Royal Society (FRS) in 2017.

References

1959 births
Living people
British physicists
British computer scientists
Computer science educators
Alumni of St Catherine's College, Oxford
Alumni of the University of Edinburgh
Academics of the University of Edinburgh
Academics of Aston University
Fellows of the British Computer Society
Fellows of Darwin College, Cambridge
Fellows of the Royal Academy of Engineering
Fellows of the Royal Society of Edinburgh
Fellows of the Royal Society
Microsoft employees
Microsoft Research people
Computer science writers